Tümentsetsegiin Üitümen (born 22 February 1971) is a Mongolian boxer. He competed at the 1996 Summer Olympics and the 2000 Summer Olympics.

References

External links
 

1971 births
Living people
Mongolian male boxers
Olympic boxers of Mongolia
Boxers at the 1996 Summer Olympics
Boxers at the 2000 Summer Olympics
Place of birth missing (living people)
Asian Games medalists in boxing
Boxers at the 1994 Asian Games
Boxers at the 1998 Asian Games
Asian Games bronze medalists for Mongolia
Medalists at the 1998 Asian Games
AIBA World Boxing Championships medalists
Lightweight boxers
21st-century Mongolian people
20th-century Mongolian people